"The Diminisher" is the alter-ego of Chicago musician David McDonnell (born  1976), who was a founding member of the trio Bablicon, bass player Griffin Rodriguez informally assigned the moniker in reference to McDonnell's liberal use of the so-called diminished chord in Bablicon songs. When Bablicon informally dissolved in 2001, he began or joined a number of experimental jazz/rock projects, such as Michael Columbia and Icy Demons, and continued composing in Chicago.

In 2006, McDonnell released a solo album on the label Unsound Records, titled Imaginary Volcano, under the name of The Diminisher.

References

1976 births
Living people